Harare Central is a constituency represented in the National Assembly of the Parliament of Zimbabwe. It is located in the central area of Harare, the capital of Zimbabwe. Like all Zimbabwean constituencies, Harare Central elects one Member of Parliament (MP) by the first-past-the-post electoral system. The seat has been represented by MP Murisi Zwizwai since a 2003 by-election.

Members of Parliament

See also 

 List of Zimbabwean parliamentary constituencies

References 

Harare
Parliamentary constituencies in Zimbabwe